The following lists events that happened during 1874 in New Zealand.

Incumbents

Regal and viceregal
Head of State — Queen Victoria
Governor — The Rt. Hon Sir James Fergusson resigns and is replaced by The Marquess of Normanby

Government and law
The 5th New Zealand Parliament continues.

Speaker of the House — Sir Francis Dillon Bell
Premier — Julius Vogel.
Minister of Finance — Julius Vogel
Chief Justice — Hon Sir George Arney

Main centre leaders
Mayor of Auckland — Philip Philips followed by Henry Isaacs followed by Frederick Prime
Mayor of Christchurch — Michael Brennan Hart followed by Fred Hobbs
Mayor of Dunedin — Henry Fish followed by Andrew Mercer
Mayor of Wellington — Charles Borlase

Events 
 1 January: Wreck of the Surat, carrying 271 passengers and 37 crew, on the Catlins coast. All survived.
 5 January: The Poverty Bay Herald begins publishing in Gisborne. It is initially bi-weekly. The paper changed its name to The Gisborne Herald in 1939, and continues to publish as a daily .
 15 January: The Nelson Examiner and New Zealand Chronicle, first published in 1842, produces its last issue.
 30 June: The Wellington Independent publishes its final issue, and is replaced by The New Zealand Times. The newspaper started in 1845. 
 18 November: Fire and sinking of the Cospatrick carrying emigrants to New Zealand near the Cape of Good Hope; one of New Zealand's worst disasters as only three of the 472 on board survived. 
The Marlborough Times begins publication bi-weekly, and absorbs The Marlborough News. It became a daily in 1882. The Marlborough Express bought it in 1895 and closed it in 1905.
 The Marine Department employs Capt. B.A. Edwin to provide weather maps and forecasts to ships, establishing New Zealand's first weather service.

Sport

Horse racing
25 May — Recorded by some sources as the date of first race meeting at Ellerslie.(see also 1857)
The Auckland Cup is established at Ellerslie Racecourse.
The Wellington Cup becomes an annual race. The first winner of which evidence survives is recorded.

Major race winners
New Zealand Cup: Tambourini
New Zealand Derby: Tadmor
Auckland Cup: Templeton
Wellington Cup: Castaway

Rugby union
 Rugby union spreads quickly, with many new clubs being formed: Ngāruawāhia, Hamilton, Cambridge, New Plymouth (Taranaki club) Hawera (Egmont club), Parnell, Grafton, Ponsonby, and Mount Hobson. Rugby was also taken up at Auckland College and Auckland Grammar School.

Shooting
Ballinger Belt: Captain Skinner (Waiuku Rifles)

Births
 8 February: Edmund Anscombe, architect.
 20 September: George Smith, athlete and rugby player.

Deaths

 22 April: Thomas Brunner, surveyor and explorer.

See also
List of years in New Zealand
Timeline of New Zealand history
History of New Zealand
Military history of New Zealand
Timeline of the New Zealand environment
Timeline of New Zealand's links with Antarctica

References
General
 Romanos, J. (2001) New Zealand Sporting Records and Lists. Auckland: Hodder Moa Beckett.
Specific

External links